"Jorinde and Joringel" is a German fairy tale collected by the Brothers Grimm (KHM 69). It is Aarne–Thompson 405. The tale is found virtually exclusively in Germany, barring a Swedish variant, although Marie Campbell found a variant in Kentucky, "The Flower of Dew". The story is known in many English translations as "Jorinda and Jorindel".

Summary
An evil shape-shifting witch (or "fairy," depending on the translation) lived alone in a dark castle in the woods. She could lure wild animals and birds to her before killing them for food. She froze to stone any man who would dare come near where she stood, and turned innocent maidens into birds and caged them. Jorinde and Joringel, two lovers engaged to be married, went for a walk in the forest. They came too near to the witch's lair. She turned Jorinde into a nightingale and petrified Joringel to the ground. Once she had carried away the bird, she freed Joringel, laughing that he would never see Jorinde again.

One night Joringel dreamed of a flower and that it would break all the witch's spell. He sought it for nine days, found it, and carried it back to the castle. He was not frozen to the ground when he approached the castle and all of the doors opened. He found the witch feeding the birds. She was unable to curse him. When she tried to take one cage away, he realized it was Jorinde. He touched the witch with the flower and her evil magic left her forever. He touched Jorinde with the flower and she became a woman again. Then he transformed all the other women back.

Variants
During the 19th Century there was barely any other variant of the story published besides the one collected by the brothers Grimm, with the exception of a Swedish version listed by Johannes Bolte and Jiri Polivka. The situation has changed in the 20th Century with some new versions found and published. A Flemish version from Willebroek titled Janneken, Mieken and the witch Peetje Loo (Janneken en Mieken en de tooverheks Peetje Loo) was collected by Victor de Meyere. In that version the protagonist and her beloved one turned into a bird by the witch are not lovers but siblings, and the spell is broken not with a flower, but hitting the witch with a snake’s hide. In a Dutch version from Driebergen titled The Golden Ball (De gouden bal), collected by Gerrit Jacob Boekenoogen, the protagonist and their beloved one are also siblings, with the differences that the brother is the one turned into a bird, and the siblings are also the children of a king. To get the magic white flower to break the spell the princess must defeat a dragon with the help of dwarfs. In an English version of the tale, the siblings are young children and named "Hansel and Gretel". Outside Europe Marie Campbell collected a version from the Appalachian Mountains titled The Flower of Dew, that follows the plot from the Grimm’s tale pretty closely.

Alternate names
In English compilations, the tale was sometimes translated as Florinda and Yoringal or as Florinda and Florindel.

In popular culture
Jorinde and Joringel is featured in Grimm's Fairy Tale Classics as part of its "Grimm Masterpiece Theater" season.
Characters named Jorinde and Joringel are featured in the adventure game "Anna's Quest".

See also

"The Old Woman in the Wood"

References

External links

 
 Jorinda and Jorindel online audiobook

Fictional German people
Grimms' Fairy Tales
Fiction about shapeshifting
Witchcraft in fairy tales
ATU 400-459